The Minister for Resources is an Australian Government cabinet position which is currently held by Madeleine King following the swearing in of the full Albanese ministry on 1 June 2022.

In the Government of Australia, the ministers administer this portfolio through the Department of Industry, Science and Resources.

Mission and outcomes
Information about the department's functions and/or government funding allocation could be found in the Administrative Arrangements Orders, the annual Portfolio Budget Statements, in the department's annual reports and on the department's website.

At its creation, the department was responsible for:
Environment protection and conservation of biodiversity
Air Quality
National fuel quality standards
Land contamination
Meteorology
Administration of the Australian Antarctic Territory and the Territory of Heard Island and McDonald Islands
Natural, built and movable cultural heritage
Greenhouse policy coordination
Environmental research
Water policy and resources

In the Howard Government, the portfolio of Water Resources was assigned to the Environment Department; this was an Australian Public Service department, staffed by officials who were responsible to the Minister for the Environment and Water Resources, Malcolm Turnbull. The secretary of the department was David Borthwick.

List of Ministers for Resources
Australia has had ministers who had specific responsibility for matters relating to the development of minerals resources since December 1972, although earlier there were ministers for national development, who had some responsibilities in this area as well.

 Morrison was appointed as Minister for Industry, Science, Energy and Resources by the Governor-General on Morrison's advice in April 2021, with both Morrison and Pitt holding the position of Minister for Resources until May 2022. However, the appointment of Morrison was not made public until August 2022.

References

External links
 

Resources